The Method Fest Independent Film Festival is an independent film festival.  The Method Fest is the Actor's Film Festival, a festival of discovery, seeking breakout-acting performances of emerging stars and established actors in story-driven independent films. The 13th The Method Fest Independent Festival was held in Beverly Hills, California, in March 2019. The festival is also dedicated to support the work of those who produce, make and work in independent film and to provide educational opportunities in independent filmmaking. The upcoming 14th The Method Fest Independent Film Festival will be held in Beverly Hills at the Fine Arts Theatre from March 20-26, 2020.

1999

2000

2001

2002

2019

References

External links

Withoutabox.com

Film festivals in California
Calabasas, California